Eaton Academy is a PreK-8 charter school in Eastpointe, Michigan.

It is located in the former St. Veronica School building. Central Michigan University is Eaton's charter authorizer. As of 2011 90% of its students come from Detroit. During that time 86% of the students were at or below the U.S. federal government's poverty level, making Eaton a Title I school. It is much smaller than most area public schools. It is accredited by AdvancED.

References

External links

 Eaton Academy

Schools in Macomb County, Michigan
Public middle schools in Michigan
Public elementary schools in Michigan
Charter schools in Michigan